Longridge is a village in West Lothian, Scotland. In 2001 the population was 650, with 92.77% of those born in Scotland and 4.31% born in England.

In 1856 the village, then known as Langrigg, had a population of 225, it had a library and a post office, and the economy of the area had improved with the discovery of blackband ironstone, known as Crofthead.

Two Longridge railway stations briefly served the village in the mid 19th century.

Work
In 2001 there were 290 in work. Among the main works in the community were:

Agriculture: 2.07%
Production: 26.55%
Construction: 8.62%
Retail: 13.45%
Tourism: 5.17%
Property: 6.9%

References

External links

Longridge Online

Villages in West Lothian